In music, Op. 152 stands for Opus number 152. Compositions that are assigned this number include:

 Lacher – Six Songs
 Milhaud – Suite provençale
 Weinberg – Symphony No. 21